Mount Baptiste is a summit in the U.S. state of Montana.

Mount Baptiste was named after Felix Baptiste, a pioneer trapper.

References

Mountains of Flathead County, Montana
Baptiste